Kiamika is a municipality in the Laurentides region of Quebec, Canada, part of the Antoine-Labelle Regional County Municipality.

Joseph Montferrand (1802-1864), a logger of imposing stature and extraordinary physical strength, was from Kiamika.

Etymology
The municipality is named after the Kiamika River, which flows through its territory and is a tributary of the Lièvre River. This name, mentioned by Stanislas Drapeau as Kiamica and appearing on a map of Quebec by Eugène Taché from 1870, comes from the Algonquin word kickiamika meaning "steep cut below the water", from kicki (steep cut) and amick (below the water).

However, an alternate meaning may be "deep and quiet river", from the roots kiam (deep) and ka (quiet).

History
In 1883, the Colonization Society of Montarville was founded and took possession of the area in 1884. A year later its post office opened. In 1890, the Kiamika Township was proclaimed.

In 1898, the Township Municipality of Kiamika was formed. In 1920, the mission received its status as a parish. In 1994, the township municipality changed its statutes to become a regular municipality.

Demographics

Private dwellings occupied by usual residents: 391 (total dwellings: 508)

Mother tongue:
 English as first language: 15
 French as first language: 750
 English and French as first language: 0
 Other as first language: 0

See also
List of municipalities in Quebec

References

External links
 

Incorporated places in Laurentides
Municipalities in Quebec